Develop or DEVELOP may refer to:

Develop (magazine), a trade publication for the video game industry
Develop (Apple magazine), a technical magazine formerly published by Apple Computer
Develop (chess), moving a piece from its original square
Develop (producer), hip hop producer known as DVLP

See also
Development (disambiguation)